Ceiliúradh was a celebration of Irish culture that took place in the Royal Albert Hall on 10 April 2014, to mark the state visit to London of Irish President Michael D. Higgins. It was attended by the President and Sabina Higgins, with Prince and Princess Michael of Kent representing the Royal Family.

The event was broadcast live on RTÉ, while an hour long highlights package was broadcast on BBC4 the following Sunday.

The event was promoted by Culture Ireland, and produced by South Wind Blows, an award winning production company in association with the venue.

Background
The event was designed as a tribute to thousands of Irish people who have made Britain their home. It was intended to showcase the links that exist between Ireland and the U.K. in the artistic and creative domains.

Running order
The running order for the event was as follows:
 House Band with Fiona Shaw - The Exiles Jig, with reading of The Song of Wandering Angus by W B Yeats
 Joseph O'Connor - The Thrill Of It All
 Paul Brady - Nothing But The Same Old Story
 House Band with Irish dancers - Medley of tunes with dancers Caitín Nic Gabhann, Seosamh O’Neachtain, Michael Maguire and Ellie Maguire
 Conor O'Brien - My Lighthouse
 Elvis Costello with Steve Naïve and Conor O’Brien - Shipbuilding
 Olivia O'Leary - Silent O Moyle, The Minstrel Boy (joined by Fiona Shaw and West Ocean String Quartet)
 Imelda May - Kentish Town Waltz, It’s Good To Be Alive
 Glen Hansard and Lisa Hannigan - Falling Slowly, The Auld Triangle (with Elvis Costello, Conor O’Brien, Paul Brady, Imelda May and John Sheahan)
 Elvis Costello - Tripwire, (What's So Funny 'Bout) Peace, Love, and Understanding
 The Gloaming - Opening Set
 Fiona Shaw - Postscript by Seamus Heaney
 All guest singers and London Irish Choir - The Parting Glass

Dermot O'Leary acted as compere for a number of the acts.

House band
The house band for the event comprised a host of Ireland's top musicians.
 Liam Bradley - percussion
 John Carty - fiddle
 Aimee Farrell Courtney - bodhrán
 Anthony Drennan - guitar
 Noel Eccles - percussion
 Graham Henderson - piano
 Dónal Lunny - bouzouki and bodhrán
 Mike McGoldrick - flute and whistles
 Paul Moore - bass
 Máirtín O'Connor - accordions
 Brendan Power - harmonica

References

2010s in Irish music
Arts in Ireland
2014 in London
Music in London
April 2014 events in the United Kingdom